Else Breen  (born 15 March 1927) is a Norwegian children's writer, novelist and literary scientist.

She was born in Molde. She made her literary breakthrough in 1970 with the children's book , about the teenage girl Mia and her family. In the sequel  (1975), Mia is a couple of years older. The short story collection  (1978) treats subjects such as rootlessness and the feeling of being different.

She has written a book on children's literature and a biographical book on Jens Zetlitz.

References

1927 births
Living people
People from Molde
Norwegian children's writers
Norwegian women children's writers